Margaret Bakkes (14 December 1931 – 29 June 2016) was a South African writer.

She was married to historian Cas Bakkes, and was the mother of four children: C. Johan Bakkes, Marius, Matilde, and Christiaan Bakkes, two of whom—Johannes and Christiaan—also became writers.

Bakkes wrote more than thirty books and short stories in Afrikaans

Bakkes died on 29 June 2016 at the age of 84.

Works
 Die Reise Van Olga Dolsjikowa En Ander Omswerwinge
 Kroniek Van Die Sewe Blou Waens: Die Kort Lewe Van Gert Maritz
 Littekens: Stories En Memories
 Susanna Die Geliefde
 Waar Jou Skat Is
 Baksel in Die Môre
 Ontheemdes
 Benedicta

References

External links
 Profile, LitNet.co.za (in Afrikaans)

1931 births
2016 deaths
South African women novelists
South African women short story writers
South African short story writers
Place of death missing
20th-century South African novelists
21st-century South African novelists
21st-century South African women writers
20th-century South African women writers